Salbia thyrsonoma is a moth in the family Crambidae. It is found in Bolivia.

References

Moths described in 1936
Spilomelinae